İsmet Ekin Koç (born 21 June 1992) is a Turkish actor and musician.

Koç left Antalya to study Business Administration (English) at the Istanbul Bilgi University and start to study online education sociology.

Career

Film
His first movie was Senden Bana Kalan, which is the adaptation of the Korean movie A Millionaire's First Love. He played the main role "Özgür Arıca", for which he won an Ayhan Işık Special Award. Shortly after, he played the one eyed soldier "Mehmed" in the British movie Ali and Nino, in which Maria Valverde and Adam Bakri were the lead actors. The movie is an adaptation of Kurban Said's novel (1937) and premiered at the Sundance Film Festival.

He starred in the film Bizim İçin: Şampiyon, based life story of jockey Halis Karataş. He is producer and actor of short film App.

He went to Cannes Film Festival with films Okul Tıraşı, Kurak Günler and short film Büyük Uçuş.

Television
Koç had his first and main role in the fantasy series Sana Bir Sır Vereceğim  in which he played a young man with invisibility power called Tilki - Kıvanç Gündoğdu. This role was his big breakthrough with his first partner Demet Özdemir. He and the cast of the TV series Sana Bir Sır Vereceğim performed the song "Sevsek Mi?", which featured on Bora Cengiz's album. Later, he played "Seyfi Yaşar" in the period series Benim Adım Gültepe.

Ekin Koç came to international attention for his role as "Sultan Ahmed I", the 14th Sultan of the Ottoman Empire, in the TV series Muhteşem Yüzyıl: Kösem, which is based on a true story. In 2017, he played in Hayat Sırları as Burak Özer.

He portrayed Ahmed Sencer the Seljuk ruler of Khorasan, in the series Uyanış: Büyük Selçuklu. He later appeared in Üç Kuruş with a story about gypsies.

Web series
He played the character Kaan in the fourth episode of  series 7 Yüz in BluTV. He played in crime series "Bozkır". He had guest role  of series Succession in HBO.

Filmography

References

External links

1992 births
Living people
Turkish Muslims
Turkish male television actors
Turkish male film actors
21st-century Turkish male actors